Asaka is a district of Andijan Region in Uzbekistan. The capital lies at Asaka.

The district consists of 1 city (Asaka), 4 urban-type settlements (Kujgan, Navkan, Oqboʻyra and T.Aliyev) and 8 rural communities.

Asaka  has always been eminent for its transportation means,- for its horses in the past and cars that GM Uzbekistan (car-manufacturing plant located in the heart of the district) produces today. In fact, the town is named after a beautiful horse which, according to a folk legend, was owned by a local mustanger.

References

Districts of Uzbekistan
Andijan Region